The 2014 Louisville Cardinals baseball team represented the University of Louisville in the 2014 NCAA Division I baseball season.  The Cardinals were coached by Dan McDonnell, in his eighth season, and played their home games at Jim Patterson Stadium.

Personnel

Roster

Coaches

Schedule

Ranking movements

References

Louisville Cardinals baseball seasons
Louisville
College World Series seasons
Louisville Cardinals baseball
Louisville